Orstkhoy-Mokhk (lit. «Land of Orstkhoy»), exonyms: Balsu, District of Karabulak — historical region on the territories of Ingushetia and Chechnya. Orstkhoy-Mokhk is the territory of historical settlement of Orstkhoy — sub-ethnic group of Ingushes and Chechens.

Name 
The name Orstkhoy-Mokhk is not recorded in any historical documents or scientific works. Often, researchers-Caucasiologists and amateur local historians (Sh. B. Akhmadov, A. S. Suleimanov, etc.), to designate the historical area of ​​the original settlement of the Arshtin people, simply use the name of the military-political and territorial union - Orstkhoy, or the term - free society Orstkhoy. In Russian-language sources, the society-nationality-region can be called as Arshtkhoy/Arshtkhoy, Orstkhoy/Orshtkhoy, Erstkhoy/Ershtkhoy. Among the Orstkhois proper and among the Ingushes, the region was called Arskhte/Arshte, among the Chechens - Arstkha/Arshtkha. The 18th-century researcher J. A. Güldenstädt calls this territory Karabulak District (from the Turkic, possibly Kumyk, the name of the Orstkhoy, which has become a widely used exonym - Karabulaks) and reports a few more toponyms that were used to designate it: among the Chechens - Ariskh Toyai/Arish Toyay , among the Circassians - Balsu, from the ancient name of the Fortanga River - Balsu (in Turkic: "Honey water").

Location 
The district was located in between Assa and Fortanga rivers.

References

Bibliography 
 
 

Geography of Ingushetia
Geography of Chechnya